Carlsbad High School is a public high school in Carlsbad, California. First opened in 1957, the high school underwent major redevelopment from 2009 to 2012. In 2010, the API index for the school was 812.

In December 2001, the band No Doubt played a surprise concert at the high school as the first episode of the MTV show "Jammed."  Students were not told of the concert until they were dismissed from class for the day. MTV staff worked with school administrators and staff to facilitate the concert between the football field and gymnasium.

Governor Arnold Schwarzenegger visited the high school on August 11, 2006 to announce his plans for the future of funding and education in California's schools.

On February 19, 2016, the band Echosmith played a concert for the school as part of the State Farm #Drive2N2 campaign. The school won the concert as a result of a safe driving video submitted by the broadcasting department to the contest. The broadcasting department received a $100,000 grant for winning.

Campus
Originally built more than fifty years ago, the campus has undergone renovation and construction on a new campus.  Renovation for the whole campus began in 2008 with the construction of a new football field and stadium.  The new 'Swede Krcmar Field' opened March 2010.  Newly built classrooms were occupied by classes beginning January 9, 2012.  The world famous skate landmark, the Carlsbad Gap, was deconstructed on February 23, 2012.  Renovation was completed in May 2012.

Enrollment 
Based on a 2019-20 survey, the total number of students enrolled at Carlsbad High is 2,404 students. There were 3 students in grade 8, 598 in 9th, 570 in 10th, 637 in 11th, and 596 in 12th. The student body is 57% White, 30.2% Hispanic or Latino, 6.3% two or more races, 4.6% Asian, and <2% other.

Achievements, awards, distinctions 

 2017 - Men's Soccer Team wins 300th game under head coach Jeff Riccitelli.
 2016 - Men's Volleyball San Diego Section Open Division Crown.
 2012 - Men's Cross Country Team won two consecutive Cif Championships, 3rd in California State Championship 2012, and 18th at Nike Cross Nationals 2012. Named San Diego's best cross country team in history.
 2010 - The Purple Shield Yearbook received first place in the North County Del Mar Fair Competition. Editors: Taylor Deisinger, Samantha Garcia, Rita Heredia and Nicole Numerich
 2010 - The Lancer Express received first place in San Diego County Fair Competition. Editors: Ben Kelly, Alex Lancial, Emma Marshall, Christina Sintek.  "Month of Tolerance" Feature received Best in Class Award at San Diego County Fair Competition.
 Home to the nationally acclaimed and award-winning CHSTV.  Official websites for CHSTV are http://www.chstv.com and http://www.chstvfilms.org
 2002, 2005 and 2006 CIF San Diego Section Football Division I Championship.
 CIF-record eight consecutive Division 1 Men's Water Polo Championships (2003, 2004, 2005, 2006, 2007, 2008, 2009, 2010, 2013, and 2014)
 Men's Swimming & Diving CIF Champions: 2003, 2004, 2005, 2006, 2007, 2008, 2009, 2010, 2013, 2014
 National Champion Lancer Dancers .  UDA National Titles include:
 2001 -  Large Varsity Jazz
 2002 -  Large Varsity Jazz, ESPN TV Challenge
 2003 -  Large Varsity Jazz
 2004 -  Small Varsity Hip Hop
 2006 -  Small Varsity Hip Hop AND Small Varsity Jazz
 2007 -  Small Varsity Jazz
 2011 -  Small Varsity Hip Hop
 2006- Show Choir (Sound Express) placed first at Hart High School Competition.
 2012 - Show Choir (Encore) placed first at SoCal Show Choir Invitational.
 2013 - Show Choir (Encore) placed first at SoCal Show Choir Invitational.
 2014 - Show Choir (Encore) placed first at SoCal Show Choir Invitational.
 2016 - Show Choir (Sound Express) placed fourth in the Advanced Mixed division at the Southern California Show Choir Invitational.
 Home to the famous Carlsbad Gap, a street skateboarding attraction popularized in skate videos and magazines. Carlsbad High School is featured in Tony Hawk 's Pro Skater 2 video game, where the gap is a skateboard obstacle.
 Carlsbad High School Television
2006, 2009, 2010, 2011, and 2012 winner of the prestigious STN Award of Excellence from the Student Television Network (STN)
CHSTV is recognized across the country as a model for scholastic broadcast journalism.
Was reportedly the winner of the STN's "Best Daily Newscast in the Nation" from 2008 to 2015.
 Carlsbad High School Art Department
 2014 – Top 5 Finalist in the national Vans Custom Culture art competition, earning $4,000 for the art department.
 2015 – Grand Prize winner, "Local Attitude" design winner, and "Truth Campaign Skateboard Deck" winner in the Vans Custom Culture art competition, totaling $75,000 in winnings for the school's art department amongst the three prizes.
 Band
 As Marching Lancers
 2003-2006 - Top-ranked band in San Diego County
 2005 - SCSBOA Class 5A Field Show Champions
 2009 - SCSBOA Class 3A Field Show Champions
 2010 - SCSBOA Class 3A Field Show Champions
 As Wind Symphony
 2004 - First high school band to perform at Carnegie Hall
 2006 - 1st place in festival held at the Kennedy Center in Washington DC
 2010 - Unanimous Superior Ranking at Heritage Festival of Gold, held in Orchestra Hall, Chicago
 The Wind Symphony achieved a Unanimous Superior ranking (the highest ranking possible) at all the competitions it attended between 1999 and 2013.
 The Wind Symphony has been invited to perform at the Sydney Opera House in Sydney, Australia, every year since 2004, but has declined each year, lacking funds for such a trip.
 Drumline
 2009 - 7th place at WGI World Percussion Championships in Dayton, Ohio
 2015 - 2nd place A-Class at SCPA Championship Finals in San Bernardino, California
 2018 - 3rd place Scholastic-A at WGI West Power Regional Finals in San Bernardino, California.
 2022 - 2nd place A-Class at SCPA Championship Finals in Ontario, California
 Color Guard
 2011 - WGASC Champions
 Speech and Debate
 National Qualifiers 2008-2013
Tournament of Champions qualifiers in multiple debates
League Champions 4 years running
 Currently ranked 5th in the State
 Currently ranked in the top 1% nationally
 Carlsbad High School Chamber Orchestra
 2011 March 12 - SCSBOA Superior Unanimous @ El Camino High School
Fall 2011- Technical Theater won 1st place for their Set and Lighting design at DTASC.
1989 Boys Baseball CIF Champions

Notable alumni

 Brady Anderson, baseball; Baltimore Orioles
 Joey Beltran, professional Mixed Martial Artist, formerly with the UFC,
 Colin Branch, cootball; Stanford University and Carolina Panthers
 Sean Canfield, football; Oregon State and New Orleans Saints
 Brandon Chillar, football; UCLA and Green Bay Packers
 Jonathan Compas, football; UC Davis and Tampa Bay Buccaneers; New England Patriots
 Lauren Fendrick, Olympic beach volleyball player
 Noelle Freeman, Miss California 2011 
 Troy Glaus, Major League Baseball player, won World Series with the Anaheim Angels (now the Los Angeles Angels of Anaheim) in 2002
 iDubbbz, YouTuber
 Nia Jax, professional wrestler
 Ted Johnson, football; University of Colorado and New England Patriots
 Scott Karl, baseball; Milwaukee Brewers, Colorado Rockies
 Taylor Knox, professional surfer
 Glen Kozlowski, football; Chicago Bears
 Michelle Laine, costume designer
 Bryan Lee-Lauduski, American football player
 Sal Masekela, actor and commentator
 Autumn Reeser, actress
 Vic So'oto, football; BYU and Green Bay Packers
 Staciana Stitts, Olympic gold medal swimmer
Robert Stromberg, Academy Award-winning film director and art director
 Brett Swain, NFL player
 Shaun White, Olympic gold medal snowboarder

References

External links
 Carlsbad High School
 CUSD Website
 Lancer Football
 Lancer Water Polo
 Lancer Track
 Lancer Surf Team
 Lancer Baseball
 Lancer Dancers
 Cheer Leading
 Lancer Lady's Soccer
 Lancer LaCrosse
 Marching Lancers and Wind Symphony
 CHS Television
 Cultural Arts Center

Educational institutions established in 1957
High schools in San Diego County, California
Public high schools in California
Carlsbad, California
1957 establishments in California